Kələzeyvə (also, Kala-Zeyna, Kelazeyva, and Zeyva) is a village in the Ismailli Rayon of Azerbaijan.  The village forms part of the municipality of Sulut.

References 

Populated places in Ismayilli District